A number of websites offer free hosting of blogs. The services they offer are compared below. (This list is limited to services that have their own Wikipedia article.)

Free blog hosting services

See also
 Comparison of file hosting services
 Comparison of online backup services

References

Blog hosting services

Companies' terms of service